The Niagara RiverHawks are a Junior ice hockey team based in Niagara Falls, Ontario, Canada.  They play in the Provincial Junior Hockey League .

History

In 1987, the Chippawa Merchants were granted an OHA Junior C franchise and were based in the Chippawa Willoughby Arena.

In 1999, the Chippawa Merchants changed their team name to the RiverHawks.

In 2001, the RiverHawks defeated the Belle River Canadiens of the Great Lakes Junior C Hockey League 4-games-to-1 to win the Clarence Schmalz Cup as Ontario Hockey Association provincial Junior C champions.

In 2010, the RiverHawks left the Chippawa Willoughby Arena for the brand new Gale Centre, located in Niagara Falls.  As a part of the move the team changed colours from their original red, white and black scheme to teal, gray and white with orange trim.

In 2014, the RiverHawks were granted a name change to the Niagara RiverHawks to reflect their use of the Gale Centre in Niagara Falls as their home arena, and their at-large status by not being affiliated with a specific Junior B hockey club.

For the 2016-17 season the Riverhawks became part of the Junior C hockey re-structure in Southern Ontario.  All junior C leagues joined under one umbrella as the Provincial Junior Hockey League.  The former Niagara & District Junior C Hockey League became the Bloomfield Division of the South Conference.

The playoffs for the 2019-20 season were cancelled due to the COVID-19 pandemic, leading to the team not being able to play a single game.

Season-by-season record
Note: GP = Games Played, W = Wins, L = Losses, T = Ties, OTL = Overtime Losses, GF = Goals for, GA = Goals against

Clarence Schmalz Cup appearances
2001: Chippawa Riverhawks defeated Belle River Canadiens 4-games-to-1

External links
Riverhawks Homepage
Riverhawks News, Schedules and Scores

Niagara Junior C Hockey League teams
1987 establishments in Ontario